USS Minidoka (AK-196) was an  that was constructed for the US Navy during the closing period of World War II. She was declared excess-to-needs and returned to the US Maritime Commission.

Construction
Minidoka, a C1-M-AV1 type cargo ship, was laid down under Maritime Commission contract, MC hull 2127, by Walter Butler Shipbuilding Co., Inc., Superior, Wisconsin, 26 August 1944; launched 13 January 1945; sponsored by Mrs. R. N. Elder; and completed 5 May 1945. While under conversion for Navy use at the Superior yard of Walter Butler, her conversion was canceled 25 August 1945.

Merchant service
Subsequently, she was returned to the Maritime Commission, renamed Coastal Herald, and operated for the Maritime Commission by Waterman Steamship Corporation and then the United Fruit Company until 1948. She was then sent to the reserve fleet awaiting sale.

On 13 July 1956, she was sold to Companhia Nacional de Navegacao Costerira, Patrimonio Nacional, of Brazil, for $693,682, under the condition that she be used for coastal shipping. She was delivered on 3 January 1957. She was scrapped in 1977.

Notes 

Citations

Bibliography 

Online resources

External links

 

Alamosa-class cargo ships
Ships built in Superior, Wisconsin
1945 ships
World War II auxiliary ships of the United States
Minidoka County, Idaho